Alexandra Panova and Tatiana Poutchek were the defending champions, but Poutchek decided not to participate.
Panova partnered with Akgul Amanmuradova, but were eliminated in the semifinals by Eleni Daniilidou and Vitalia Diatchenko.
Daniilidou and Diatchenko later defeated Lyudmyla Kichenok and Nadiya Kichenok in the final, 6–4, 6–3.

Seeds

  Olga Govortsova /  Alla Kudryavtseva (withdrew due to Govortsova's right elbow injury)
  Eleni Daniilidou /  Vitalia Diatchenko (champions)
  Akgul Amanmuradova /  Alexandra Panova (semifinals)
  Sorana Cîrstea /  Pauline Parmentier (first round)

Draw

Draw

References
 Main Draw

Tashkent Open - Doubles
2011 Tashkent Open